Slezany may refer to:
Ślęzany, Silesian Voivodeship, Poland
Ślężany, Masovian Voivodeship, Poland